Events from the year 1916 in Russia.

Incumbents
 Monarch – Nicholas II 
 Chairman of the Council of Ministers – 
 until 2 February – Ivan Logginovich Goremykin 
 2 February-23 November – Boris Stürmer
 starting 23 November – Alexander Fyodorovich Trepov

Events

 
 
 
 
 
 
 Baranovichi Offensive
 Battle of Kostiuchnówka
 Battle of Bitlis
 Brusilov Offensive
 Battle of Erzincan
 Erzurum Offensive
 Battle of Kowel
 Lake Naroch Offensive
 Trebizond Campaign
 Urkun

Births

 9 September — Ada Tschechowa, Russo-German actress (died 1966)

Deaths

References

1916 in Russia
Years of the 20th century in the Russian Empire